Schools of the Conseil des écoles publiques de l'Est de l'Ontario.

Elementary

Ottawa
École élémentaire publique Charlotte-Lemieux, Nepean
École élémentaire publique Francojeunesse, Ottawa
École élémentaire publique Gabrielle-Roy, Ottawa
École élémentaire publique Jeanne Sauve, Orléans
École élémentaire publique Kanata, Kanata
École élémentaire publique Mauril-Bélanger, Ottawa
École élémentaire publique Marie-Curie, Ottawa
École élémentaire publique Maurice Lapointe, Kanata
École élémentaire publique Michel-Dupuis, Riverside South
École élémentaire publique Séraphin-Marion, Gloucester
École élémentaire publique l'Odyssée, Orléans
École élémentaire publique Ottawa Ouest, Nepean
École élémentaire publique le Transit, Ottawa

Other
École élémentaire publique Cité-Jeunesse, Trenton
École élémentaire publique l'Équinoxe, Pembroke

Secondary

Ottawa
École secondaire publique De La Salle, Ottawa
École secondaire publique Gisèle-Lalonde, Orléans
École secondaire publique Louis-Riel, Gloucester
École secondaire publique Omer Deslauriers, Nepean
École secondaire publique Le Transit, Ottawa

Other
École secondaire publique L'Équinoxe, Pembroke 
École secondaire publique Marc-Garneau, Trenton 
École secondaire publique Le Sommet, Hawksbury

See also
List of school districts in Ontario
List of high schools in Ontario

Ottawa, Public Schools, French

Schools of the Conseil des ecoles publiques de l'Est de l'Ontario